Rabīʿ bin Hādī ʿUmayr al Madkhalī is a Saudi professor who is a former head of the Sunnah Studies Department at the Islamic University of Madinah. He is a Salafi Muslim scholar who is considered to be one of Salafism's prominent thinkers, and is known for his unrelenting criticism of the Muslim Brotherhood.

Biography

Education and career
Rabee Al-Madkhali began seeking knowledge in his village from Ahmad bin Muhammad Jabir Al-Madkhali and Muhammad bin Jabir Al-Madkhali after he turned eight years old. His teacher before his study at the 'Ma’had al-’Ilmi' in Samtah was Nasir Khalufah Mubaraki (one of Abdullah ibn Muhammad Al-Qar’awi’s students). After completing several classical Islamic texts with him, he started his education at the Ma’had al-’ilmi in Samtah. The most notable of his teachers were: Hafidh ibn Ahmed Ali al-Hakami, Muhammad bin Ahmad Al-Hakami, Ahmad bin Yahya Al-Najmi, Muhammad Aman Al-Jami' and Muhammad Saghir Al-Khamisi.

In 1961, he entered the Faculty of Sharia at Imam Muhammad ibn Saud Islamic University in Riyadh for two months and then switched to the Faculty of Sharia at the Islamic University of Madinah, where his teachers included former Mufti of Saudi Arabia, Abd al-Aziz ibn Baz, Muhammad Nasiruddin al-Albani, Abdul-Muhsin Al-Abbad, Muhammad Amin Al-Shanqiti, Saleh Al-Iraqi and Abdul-Ghaffar Hasan Al-Hindi. He graduated four years later with excellence. After working at the University, he returned to complete his higher education. He received his master's degree after publishing his thesis, ″Between imams Muslim and Daruqutni″ and achieved his doctorate with distinction with his dissertation. After completing his Doctorate at Umm al-Qura in 1980, Madkhali returned to the Islamic University of Madinah where he taught at the Faculty of Hadith and later became the head of the Department of Sunnah in the Department of Higher Studies. He held the chair until his retirement in the mid-1990s.

Having been an opponent of the House of Saud but then having turned strongly pro-establishment by the early 1990s, the Saudi government promoted al-Madkhali to lead a countermovement against growing criticisms of the Kingdom's socioeconomic ills, late deliveries of farm subsidies and normalization of ties with Israel. After the Gulf War had concluded, Madkhali distributed a booklet justifying the decision of the Saudi Arabian government to allow the presence of U.S. troops (who later withdrew) on Arabian soil and criticizing rival controversial radical cleric Safar Al-Hawali for the latter's opposition to the government's decision. In 2016, he issued a fatwa calling upon "the Salafis of Libya" to rebel against the UN-recognized Government of National Accord in favor of Khalifa Haftar, who has been described as "Libya's most potent warlord".

Scholarly works
Al-Madkhali has authored over 30 works in the field of Hadith and Islamic sciences, much of which has been compiled into a 15 volume set  In 1984, the book which brought him fame in the Saudi religious field, 'Manhaj Al-Anbiyah Fi Da’wah Ila Allah' (The Methodology of the Prophets in Calling to Allah), caused controversy over Al-Madkhali's criticisms of the Muslim Brotherhood and their methods in Muslim missionary work. According to Lacroix, Al-Madkhali insisted that priority must be given to correcting Islamic creed amongst the people, whereas the Muslim Brotherhood's initial focus was on political reform. Some observers state that Al-Madkhali is most noted for his refutations of Islamic thinker Sayyid Qutb. Al-Madkhali received acclamations for his works refuting radical preacher  Sayyid Qutb from other Salafist scholars such as Saleh Al-Fawzan, Muqbil bin Hadi al-Wadi'i, and Muhammad ibn al Uthaymeen. Of his four books on Sayyid Qutb, 'Adhwa Islamiyyah ala aqidat Sayyid Qutb wa fikrihi' is considered the most important. Apart from his praised works in refutations, his other authorships include:

 “Bainal-Imāmain Muslim Wad-Daruqutnī” – “Between the Two Imams: Muslim and Ad-Dar Qutni.” And this was one large volume which was the thesis of his Magistrates degree.
 “An-Nukat ‘Ala Kitāb Ibn Salāh” – “Points Upon the Book of Ibn Salāh.” Published in 2 volumes and it was his PhD thesis.
 “Manhajul-Anbiyā’ Fid-Da’wah IlAllāh Fīhī Al-Hikmah Wal-‘Aql” – “The Methodology of the Prophets in Calling to Allāh: In it was Wisdom and Intellect”
 “Manhaj Ahlus-Sunnah Fī Naqd Ar-Rijāl Wal-Kutub Wat–Tawā’if” – “The Methodology of The People of Sunnah in Criticism of Men, Books, and Groups.”
 “Kashf Mawqif Al-Ghazālī Min As-Sunnah Wa-Ahlihā” – “Exposing Ghazālī’s Position Regarding the Sunnah and Its People.”
 “Makānatu Ahlil-Hadīth” – “The Position of the People of Hadīth”
 “Manhaj Al-Imām Muslim Fī Tartībi Sahīhihī” – “Al-Imām Muslim’s Method in Ordering his Sahīh.”
 “Adhwā’ Islāmiyyah ‘Alā ‘Aqīdah Sayyid Qutb wa Fikarihī” – “The Illumination of Islām Regarding the Creed of Sayyid Qutb and his Ideas.”
 “Matā’in Sayyid Qutb fī As-hābi Rasūlillāh SallAllāhu Alaihi wa Sallam” – “The Slanders of Sayyid Qutb Upon the Companions of the Messenger of Allāh (H).”
 “Al-Hadd Al-Fāsil Bainal-Haqq Wal-Bātil” – “The Distinct Separation Between Truth and Falsehood,” which was part of critical dialogue between him and Bakr Abū Zaid
 “Jamā’ah Wāhidah Lā Jamā’āt; Wa Sīrat Wāhid Lā ‘Asharāt” – “One Jamā’ah – Not Many Jamā’ahs; and One Path – Not Tens of Paths,” which was part of a critical dialogue with ‘Abdur-Rahmān ‘Abdul-Khāliq.

Colleague's view
Contemporary hadith scholar Muhammad Nasiruddin al-Albani regarded Al-Madkhali to be very knowledgeable in the field of hadith, particularly in Al-Jarh wa-l-Ta’dil. Al-Albani stated that, “the carrier of the flag of [knowledge] of Jarh wa Ta'deel today, in this present time, and rightfully so, is our brother Dr. Rabee’, and those who refute him do so without any knowledge." He has also received praise from other contemporary Salafist scholars such as Abd al-Aziz ibn Baz, Saleh Al-Fawzan, Muhammad ibn al-Uthaymeen, Muqbil bin Hadi al-Wadi'i, and the Grand Mufti of Saudi Arabia among many others who praised him for being a firm defender of Islam's core values. Roel Meijer notes that some analysts view Madkhali’s followers as having an obsession with his defense and continuously cite scholarly praise of him as a mechanism "for maintaining, defending and enhancing this authority", which is contested by Madkhali's detractors.

Political scientist Gilles Kepel has described Madkhali as being the perfect example of pro-regime "court scholars" in the Middle East, as opposed to more radical trends within the Salafist movement. In contrast to his early opposition to the Saudi Arabian government, Madkhali is now considered one of the Saudi royal family's staunchest defenders. While politically quietist within his own country, Madkhali has supported violent conflict in other areas, having called on Muslims both inside and outside Indonesia to participate in the Maluku sectarian conflict.

Madkhali's source of religious authority within the Salafist movement is unclear. He has not been involved with official religious bodies of the Saudi government, does not belong to the significant line of 20th-century Salafist scholars including Abd al-Aziz ibn Baz and Muhammad Nasiruddin al-Albani, and has been described as below the level of contemporaries such as Muhammad ibn al Uthaymeen or Saleh Al-Fawzan. Some anti-Muslim Brotherhood figures like Muqbil ibn Hadi al Wadi'i are huge supporters of Al-Madkhali and consider him to be a senior scholar. According to Al-Wadi'i:"From the most insightful of people concerning the [misguided] groups and their taints in this era is the brother, Shaikh Rabī’ bin Hādī, may Allāh preserve him. Whomever he declares to be a hizbī, then it will be unveiled [and made clear] for you after some days that he is indeed a hizbī...I advise you to ask Shaikh Rabī’ bin Hādī, may Allāh  preserve him. A great deal of his life has passed with [dealing with] al-Ikhwān al-Muslimīn. He is the most knowledge person concerning them and their realities"

References

External links
 

1931 births
Living people
Hadith scholars
Saudi Arabian Sunni Muslim scholars of Islam
Saudi Arabian Salafis
Salafi Quietists
Umm al-Qura University alumni
Islamic University of Madinah alumni